Relaxation response may refer to:

 The Relaxation Response, a term coined by Herbert Benson and a book of the same name in which he describes his research into the effects of meditation
 Dielectric relaxation, the relaxation response of a dielectric medium to an external electric field of microwave frequencies